Spider-Man's Tangled Web is a comic book series starring Spider-Man and his supporting cast published by Marvel Comics for 22 issues from June 2001 to March 2003.

Overview
The title was conceived as an anthology series, where various creative teams not usually associated with Spider-Man (usually creators who had previously worked for alternative or Vertigo comics) could display their take on the character. Despite having his name in the title, Spider-Man was often an ancillary character in these stories, appearing on only a few pages or just making a cameo appearance.

Sales on the series lagged behind the other Spider-Man titles throughout its run, and it was finally cancelled in 2003 to make way for the new The Spectacular Spider-Man vol. 2 comic by Paul Jenkins and Humberto Ramos.

Issue #1 was the subject of a recall due to the incorrect paper stock being used for the cover. A second print run was ordered with the correct paper stock, thus making a collector's item of the rarer first print.

Issues
"The Coming of the Thousand", Part 1 by Garth Ennis, John McCrea, and James Hodgkins
"The Coming of the Thousand", Part 2 by Ennis, McCrea, and Hodgkins
"The Coming of the Thousand", Part 3 by Ennis, McCrea, and Hodgkins
"Severance Package" by Greg Rucka and Eduardo Risso
Featuring the Kingpin
"Flowers for Rhino", Part 1 by Peter Milligan and Duncan Fegredo
Featuring the Rhino
"Flowers for Rhino", Part 2 by Milligan and Fegredo
Featuring the Rhino
"Gentleman's Agreement", Part 1 by Bruce Jones, Lee Weeks, and Josef Rubinstein
"Gentleman's Agreement", Part 2 by Jones, Weeks, and Rubinstein
"Gentleman's Agreement", Part 3 by Jones, Weeks, Rubinstein, and Jimmy Palmiotti
"Ray of Light" by Kaare Andrews
Featuring Electro
"Open All Night" by Darwyn Cooke and Jay Bone
Featuring the Vulture
"I was a Teenage Frogman" by Zeb Wells and Duncan Fegredo
Featuring Frogman
"Double Shots" by Ron Zimmerman and Sean Phillips
Featuring Alyosha Kravinoff, the Vulture, Tombstone, Norman Osborn
"The Last Shoot" by Brian Azzarello, Scott Levy, and Giuseppe Camuncoli
Featuring Crusher Hogan
"The Collaborators" by Paul Pope
"Heartbreaker" Part 1 by Daniel Way and Leandro Fernandez
Featuring Tombstone, Kangaroo
"Heartbreaker" Part 2 by Daniel Way and Leandro Fernandez
Featuring Tombstone, Kangaroo
"Alphabet City" by Ted McKeever 
Featuring Typeface, Spellcheck
"Call of the Wild" by Robbie Morrison and Jim Mahfood
"Behind the Mustache" by Zeb Wells and Dean Haspiel
Featuring J. Jonah Jameson
"'Twas the Fight Before Christmas" by Darwyn Cooke and Jay Bone                               
Featuring Fantastic Four, Medusa
"The System" by Brian Patrick Walsh and Alberto Dose

Collected editions

Issues #4-6 and #10-11 were also included in Best of Spider-Man Vol. 1 and Best of Spider-Man Vol. 2, respectively.

References

Sources
The Unofficial Handbook of Marvel Comics Creators
 Tangled Web page at SpiderFan.org

Spider-Man titles
2001 comics debuts
2003 comics endings